United Nations Security Council resolution 671, adopted unanimously on 27 September 1990, after recalling resolutions 598 (1987), 619 (1988), 631 (1989), 642 (1989) and 651 (1990), and having considered a report by the Secretary-General Javier Pérez de Cuéllar on the United Nations Iran–Iraq Military Observer Group, the Council decided:

(a) to renew the mandate of the United Nations Iran–Iraq Military Observer Group for another two months until 30 November 1990;
(b) to request the Secretary-General, after discussions with both parties, to report on the future of the Observer Group with his recommendations during November.

See also
 Iran–Iraq relations
 Iran–Iraq War
 List of United Nations Security Council Resolutions 601 to 700 (1987–1991)

References

External links
 
Text of the Resolution at undocs.org

 0671
 0671
1990 in Iran
1990 in Iraq
September 1990 events